Proletarsky is a rural locality (a settlement) in Yavengskoye Rural Settlement, Vozhegodsky District, Vologda Oblast, Russia. The population was 419 as of 2002. There are 11 streets.

Geography 
Proletarsky is located 19 km north of Vozhega (the district's administrative centre) by road. Pokrovskoye is the nearest rural locality.

References 

Rural localities in Vozhegodsky District